Sean McKeon (born December 28, 1997) is an American football tight end for the Dallas Cowboys of the National Football League (NFL). He played college football at Michigan.

Early years 
McKeon attended Shepherd Hill Regional High School. As a sophomore, he only played as a defensive end, totaling 38 tackles (3 for loss), 2 sacks, one pass defensed, one fumble recovery and one blocked a field goal. 

As a junior, he was a two-way player at tight end and defensive end, contributing to the team having a 10-2 record and winning the Division 4 Central Region state championship.

As a senior, he played in a Double Wing run-oriented offense, tallying 23 receptions for 334 yards and 3 touchdowns, while also making 57 tackles (11 for loss), 8 sacks, 2 fumble recoveries and 2 blocked field goals.

He was a two-time USA Today All-State, ESPN Boston All-State, Suite Sports Central Massachusetts All-Star, Central Massachusetts All-Star and Max Prep All-State selection.

College career 
McKeon accepted a football scholarship from the University of Michigan. As a true freshman, he appeared in 4 games as a backup tight end behind Jake Butt. He made 2 receptions for 10 yards.

As a sophomore, he appeared in all 13 games with 10 starts at tight end. He registered 31 receptions (led the team), 301 receiving yards (second on the team) and 3 receiving touchdowns (led the team). He had 5 receptions for 82 yards against Purdue University.

As a junior, he appeared in all 13 games as a backup tight end behind Zach Gentry. He was used mostly for blocking purposes and on the special teams units, posting 14 receptions for 122 yards and one touchdown.

As a senior, he appeared in 10 games with 7 starts, while sharing the tight end duties with Nick Eubanks. He missed 3 games with a leg injury he suffered against the University of Wisconsin. He was used mostly for blocking purposes and on the special teams units, collecting 13 receptions (sixth on the team) for 235 yards (sixth on the team) and 2 receiving touchdowns (fourth on the team).

Professional career

McKeon was signed as an undrafted free agent by the Dallas Cowboys after the 2020 NFL Draft on April 27. The team made the unconventional move of keeping him as the fourth tight end to avoid losing him to waivers. He became the third-string tight end, after the starter Blake Jarwin suffered a season-ending knee injury in the first game against the Los Angeles Rams. He appeared in 14 games with one start and played mainly on special teams. In Week 7, he started against the Washington Football Team when the team opened the game with a three tight end formation.

On September 2, 2021, McKeon was placed on injured reserve to start the season. He was activated on November 3, 2021.

On November 14, 2021 Sean registered his first NFL reception while playing against his former Shepherd Hill Regional High School teammate, Chris Lindstrom and the Atlanta Falcons.

On Thanksgiving Day, November 25, 2021 Sean caught his first career receiving touchdown. A 10 yard pass from Dak Prescott against the Las Vegas Raiders. In the span of 9 games (2 started), McKeon recorded 4 catches of 27 and a touchdown.

On August 30, 2022, McKeon was waived by the Cowboys and signed to the practice squad the next day. He was promoted to the active roster on October 29.

References

External links
 Michigan Wolverines bio

1997 births
Living people
People from Dudley, Massachusetts
Sportspeople from Worcester County, Massachusetts
Players of American football from Massachusetts
American football tight ends
Michigan Wolverines football players
Dallas Cowboys players